The James Bond Car Collection (or Bond in Motion) was a partwork magazine published by Eaglemoss Publications in the United Kingdom. In the UK, each issue was priced at £7.99 (issue 1: £2.99) and came with a 1:43 model of a car in a diorama from a James Bond film. Initially the models were produced by Universal Hobbies, later issues were models sourced from Ixo. In late 2005/January 2006 the magazine was first tested in two French regions, ending after five issues. These included models made by Eligor and Norev, instead of the Universal Hobbies models used later. After the Rolls-Royce had been distributed, the series finished until being redistributed as Bond in Motion in 2017.

Information
The James Bond Car Collection was a fortnightly (later monthly) release of James Bond model cars displayed in detailed scenes from the James Bond movies. From Bond's first car, the Sunbeam Alpine, to his newest, the Aston Martin DB10. The most legendary and some not so legendary cars from more than 50 years of Bond movies are featured. Each magazine issue came with a 1:43-scale model car from an Eon Productions James Bond movie, diecast in metal, with some models including gadgets and character figurines displayed on a moulded base.

Each magazine includes exclusive interviews, behind the scenes photos and anecdotes with 007's creators, actors and stunt drivers and movie trivia. General information and history of each real car. The front cover had pictures of the Bond actors from the movie that the car was in. On occasions other characters are shown, villains or allies. The back cover had posters of the Bond movie from different countries of the world. The centre spread usually had a photo of the car as it is/was available to general public, often a publicity shot from the manufacturer.

Issues
The complete collection comprises 135 issues, with 3 further models supplied as gifts to early subscribers. To start with only 40 issues were scheduled for the collection, but due to popularity, and after numerous extensions the collection finished at 135, with a total price of over £1000. The final issue contained an Aston Martin DB10 from Spectre.

The magazine was also published in France  (although discontinued after issue 84), Finland , Germany , The Netherlands  and Brazil . Subscriptions are available for the UK, Ireland, France, Finland, Germany, Austria, Switzerland, Luxembourg, The Netherlands, Belgium, Greece, Australia, New Zealand, South Africa, Argentina, Peru and Brazil. Release order is depending on location, e.g. the Brazilian car MP Lafer was released very early, as issue 7, in Brazil.

The collection compromised:

Errors
Throughout the collection, collectors noticed a number of errors both in the printed publication and the models themselves. Notable examples include;
 Some of the issues have the same photo of Bond on the front cover: 4 & 87, 16 & 95, 20 & 85, 29 & 99, 37 & 86, 41 & 100, 50 & 96, 60 & 91. While others have the same poster on the back cover. Issue 6 is the only magazine not to feature 007 on the cover, Zao is used.
 Models from 'Casino Royale' (except issue 100) and 'Quantum of Solace' have been neglected miniature figures, even if the scene in which they are depicted requires one.
 Felix Leiter's 1964 Thunderbird from issue 42 has the taillights of the 1965 model.
 issue 50, The model is a copy of the original MG TD with several modifications, not the MP Lafer.
 issue 64: The Bentley made on a larger scale than 1:43, its scale of about 1:35.
 Issue 65, The Italian police Defender chasing Bond and the Alfa Romeos is supposed to be a 2.5 Puma, but the model is actually an older TD5.
 Issue 69 is highly inaccurate in relation to the rear end of the real Aston Martin V8 Volante.
 Issue 70 wrongly contained the X350 version of the Daimler Super-8 instead of the X308 Daimler Super V8 as featured in the film.
 The Audi 200 quattro from issue 72 is out of proportion and not an accurate model. It does however correctly show the flared fenders of the Exclusive version featured in the film.
 issue 76: The Ford Ranchero is out of proportion and not an accurate model.  Cab 1:36, grille 1:40, 1:43 etc.
 Issue 84: The Dragon Tank is out of proportion vertically and not an accurate model.
 Issue 87: On page 7 'MI6 on Location', picture 8 with M sitting at her desk claimed it was from 'Casino Royale' but it is a picture from 'Quantum of Solace'.
 Issue 88 is a model of a Cadillac hearse converted by Miller-Meteor, not the Superior Coach Company as shown in the film. The magazine also includes a wrong poster on the back. A 'Dr. No' one is published instead of one from 'Diamonds Are Forever'.
 The first run of issue 89's box lists the Ford Anglia as being from the film 'From Russia with Love' when in fact it was from 'Dr. No'. This has been corrected for later releases in other countries.
 Issue 99 purports that the military officer Bond impersonates to seek access to the airfield seen at the start of 'Octopussy' is General Toro, he was in fact of the rank of Colonel not General as the magazine erroneously states.
 Issue 102, the Bondola has a grey base as opposed to the rest of the collection which have black bases. The vehicle also lacks a figure of Roger Moore and it is in the much smaller scale of 1:72.
 (German) Issue 105 says that the Ford Country Squire has an engine size of 36,390 cc.
 issue 108, The model shows the version 1972 with sliding side door, while in the movie - the bus from 1971 with a conventional door.
 Issue 111, Largo's 1965 Thunderbird retains the 1964 grille from issue 42.
 Issue 113, the VAZ as featured in 'GoldenEye' has the wrong 'Lada Niva' rear badge.
 Issue 117, The Mercedes Benz Model is not of a W180 220s but a W120 180 which has indicator on side of fender near windscreen
 Issue 118, The Lada 2105 has bumpers, interior and tail lights from 2107 model.
 Issue 119: The back of the diorama for the model states the film is 'For Your Eyes Only', rather than the correct film 'Thunderball'. The Lincoln Continental limousine is poorly modelled, particularly the passenger compartment, curved shoulderline and too large taillights. The reverse lights are moulded in red instead of clear plastic.
 Issue 120: The back of the diorama has no film listed although the corresponding film was printed on the preceding issue. The model of Mercedes lacks the Locque's figure.
 Issue 121: The Volga has no front window leaves.
 Issue 122: The model of Mercedes 200D shows the 1968 version instead of 1974 facelift.
 issue 125: The model shows the long-wheelbase version of the Dodge Ram,  pickup in the movie  with the standard wheelbase.
 Issue 127: The Ambulance is facing the wrong direction.
 Issue 128: The Morris Minor neglects to have a registration plate present, and the folded up roof is the incorrect colour; being that of the car's body

See also
 James Bond Cars
 James Bond Gadgets
 Outline of James Bond

External links
 Eaglemoss Publications
 Bissett Mags
 MI6 interview with Car Collection's project manager
 Marvel Customs Page on the collection
 Movie Replicars with The James Bond Car Collection Showcase
 Commander Bond Article on the collection
 Chronicle of 007 James Bond Cars

Automobile magazines published in the United Kingdom
Biweekly magazines published in the United Kingdom
Defunct magazines published in the United Kingdom
James Bond lists
Magazines established in 2007
Magazines disestablished in 2017
Partworks